is a Quasi-National Park in Fukuoka Prefecture, Japan.

See also

 List of national parks of Japan

References

National parks of Japan
Parks and gardens in Fukuoka Prefecture
Protected areas established in 1972